The Definitions of Hermes Trismegistus to Asclepius is a collection of aphorisms attributed to the legendary Hellenistic figure Hermes Trismegistus (a syncretic combination of the Greek god Hermes and the Egyptian god Thoth), most likely dating to the first century CE.

According to Jean-Pierre Mahé, these aphorisms contain the core of the teachings which are found in the later Greek religio-philosophical Hermetica (writings attributed to Hermes Trismegistus).

Dating
The work has mainly been preserved in a sixth-century CE Armenian translation, but the Greek original likely goes back to the first century CE. As such, it is the oldest of the religio-philosophical Hermetica, which were mainly written between c. 100 and c. 300 CE. The main argument for the early dating of the Definitions is the fact that some of its aphorisms are cited in multiple independent Greek Hermetic works.

References

Bibliography

Editions and translations

  (critical edition of the Armenian text)
  (English translation, with introduction)

Secondary literature

 
 
 
  (review of Mahé 1978–1982)

Hermetica
1st-century books
Armenian literature